Olugbenga "Gbenga" Ajilore is an American economist who is a senior advisor in the Office of the Under Secretary for Rural Development at the United States Department of Agriculture. Prior to his current role, he was a senior economist at the Center for American Progress and former associate professor of economics at the University of Toledo. He is a past president of the National Economic Association and is a frequent media commentator on the labor market, particularly for Black Americans.

Education and early life 

Ajilore grew up in the city of Pasadena and attended Polytechnic School (California), before earning a B.A. in applied mathematics and economics from the University of California at Berkeley and a PhD in economics from the Claremont Graduate University.

Career 

Ajilore was an assistant and associate professor at the University of Toledo from 2003 to 2018. During this period, he conducted research on tax policy and peer social networks, as well as racial bias and policing, particularly the use of lethal and nonlethal physical force by police and police militarization. Since joining the Center for American Progress in 2018, much of his work has focused on the economy of rural America.

Selected research publications 

 Ajilore, Olugbenga. "The militarization of local law enforcement: is race a factor?." Applied Economics Letters 22, no. 13 (2015): 1089–1093.
 Ali, Mir M., and Olugbenga Ajilore. "Can marriage reduce risky health behavior for African-Americans?." Journal of Family and Economic Issues 32, no. 2 (2011): 191–203.
 Ajilore, Olugbenga, and John Smith. "Ethnic fragmentation and police spending." Applied Economics Letters 18, no. 4 (2011): 329–332.
 Ajilore, Olugbenga, Aliaksandr Amialchuk, and Keven Egan. "Alcohol consumption by youth: peers, parents, or prices?." Economics & Human Biology 23 (2016): 76–83.
 Ajilore, Olugbenga. "Identifying peer effects using spatial analysis: the role of peers on risky sexual behavior." Review of Economics of the Household 13, no. 3 (2015): 635–652.

References

External links 

 STRENGTHENING OUR FISCAL TOOLKIT: POLICY OPTIONS TO IMPROVE ECONOMIC RESILIENCY, Committee on the Budget, U.S. House of Representatives, Testimony by Olugbenga Ajilore, Ph.D., Senior Economist, Center for American Progress, October 16, 2019, https://budget.house.gov/sites/democrats.budget.house.gov/files/documents/Ajilore_Testimony.pdf

African-American economists
Labor economists
Public economists
Claremont Graduate University alumni
UC Berkeley College of Letters and Science alumni
Year of birth missing (living people)
Living people
University of Toledo faculty
United States Department of Agriculture officials
Presidents of the National Economic Association
21st-century African-American people